Ignaz Saal (26 July 1761 – 30 October 1836) was an operatic bass and comedian. He was for decades a member of the Imperial Court Theatre in Vienna. Saal performed the bass parts in the world premieres of Haydn's oratorios Die Schöpfung and Die Jahreszeiten, and appeared as Don Fernando in the premiere of Beethovens Fidelio on 23 May 1814 at the court theatre.

Life 
Born in Geiselhöring, Saal received musical instructions in voice and instruments early. He ended 1777 as seminarist of the Domus Gregoriana at the Churfürstliches Gymnasium in Munich (today Wilhelmsgymnasium). The same year, he made his debut at the theatre in Munich at the age of 16, and went to Pressburg in 1781. In Salzburg, he had contact to Leopold Mozart and Michael Haydn. From 1 March 1782 to 30 November 1821, Saal was a member of the Viennese imperial court theatre and bore the title K. k. Hofschauspieler. He performed leading roles of the German and Italian repertoire, including Almaviva in Mozart's Le nozze di Figaro and Sarastro in Die Zauberflöte. In addition he belonged to the ensemble of the Wiener Hofmusikkapelle from 1 July 1795.

He sang in the world premieres of Haydn's oratorios Die Schöpfung on 29 and 30 April 1798 and Die Jahreszeiten on 24 April 1801. 
He appeared as the minister Don Fernando in the premiere of the final version of Beethoven's opera, then called Fidelio, on 23 May 1814 at the court theatre.

His last residence was located on  No. 632 in Vienna, where he died at the age of 75 from a stroke.

Family 
Saal's wife was the singer and actress Anna Maria Saal (17621808). Their daughter Therese Saal (17821855) was also a member of the court theatre from 1801 to 1805 and later married the art collector Franz Gawet (17651847). His son Franz Saal (c. 17821862) belonged to the court theatres from 1808 to 1811 and last worked in Brno.

Further reading 
 Constantin von Wurzbach: Saal, Ignaz. In Biographisches Lexikon des Kaiserthums Oesterreich. 28. Theil. Kaiserlich-königliche Hof- und Staatsdruckerei, Vienna 1874, Saal, Ignaz
 Katalog der Portrait-Sammlung der k. u. k. General-Intendanz der k. k. Hoftheater. Zugleich ein biographisches Hilfsbuch auf dem Gebiet von Theater und Musik. Zweite Abtheilung. Gruppe IV. Wiener Hoftheater, Vienna 1892, .
 Alexander Wheelock Thayer: Ludwig van Beethovens Leben, edited by Hermann Deiters, volume 3, Leipzig 1917.
 Willy Hess: [https://www.worldcat.org/oclc/715750758 Das Fidelio-Buch : Beethovens Oper Fidelio, ihre Geschichte und ihre drei Fassungen]'', Winterthur 1986.

References

Cited sources

External links 

 

18th-century Austrian male opera singers
Operatic basses
1761 births
1836 deaths
19th-century Austrian male opera singers